3 Bar Ranch Cattle Callin' is the seventh studio album by Hank Williams III, released on September 6, 2011 on Hank 3 Records, through Megaforce Records.

Critical reception
3 Bar Ranch Cattle Callin''' was met with "mixed or average" reviews from critics. At Metacritic, which assigns a weighted average rating out of 100 to reviews from mainstream publications, this release received an average score of 46 based on 6 reviews.

In a review for Slant Magazine, critic reviewer Jonathan Keefe wrote: "Cattle Callin is a concept record whose concept is so deeply flawed that it never should've made it as far as the studio. Cattle Callin'' provides Hank 3 with another opportunity to showcase his technical chops, even his arrangements and vicious guitar riffs grow repetitive after the first few tracks."

Track listing

References

Hank Williams III albums
2011 albums
Megaforce Records albums
Country metal albums